GMA Saturday/Sunday Report is a Philippine television news broadcasting show broadcast by GMA Network. It premiered on May 24, 1986. The show concluded on August 20, 1989.

Anchors
 Bong Lapira 
 Jimmy Gil 
 Raffy Marcelo 
 Romy de Moro 
 Sharon Lacanilao 

1986 Philippine television series debuts
1989 Philippine television series endings
English-language television shows
GMA Network news shows
Philippine television news shows